Ionuț Andrei Zaharia (born 19 July 2003) is a Romanian professional footballer who plays as a forward. Zaharia made its debut in the Liga III at only 15 years old, then two years later played its first minute in the Romanian top-flight.

References

External links
 

2003 births
Living people
People from Moreni
Romanian footballers
Association football forwards
Liga I players
Liga II players
FC Astra Giurgiu players